A fixed-term contract is a contractual relationship between an employee and an employer that lasts for a specified period. These contracts are usually regulated by countries' labor laws, to ensure that employers still fulfill basic labour rights regardless of a contract's form, particularly unjust dismissal. Generally, fixed-term contracts will automatically be deemed to have created a permanent contract, subject to the employer's right to terminate employment on reasonable notice for a good reason. In the European Union the incidence of fixed-term contracts ranges from 6% in the UK to 23% in Spain, with Germany, Italy and France between 13% and 16%.

By country
Due to the potential job insecurity that multiple fixed-term contracts may cause, employment laws in many countries limit the circumstances and the way these contracts may be used. In countries where labour law is more restrictive (compensation/indemnity for dismissal), the differentiation between fixed-term and permanent contracts tends to be clearly set out in law. Where employment legislation is less protective for the employee there tends to be a lesser degree of differentiation between fixed and permanent contracts.

Belgium
There are two possibilities to contract successive fixed-term contracts:

 Successive employment contracts with a maximum term of two years: A maximum of four successive fixed-term employment contracts, where the minimum duration of each contract is three months and the total duration of all the successive contracts is not longer than two years. 
 Successive employment contracts with a maximum term of three years: With the prior authorisation of the Belgian Federal Public Service Employment, Labour and Social Dialogue, successive fixed-term contracts can be concluded with a minimum duration of six months if the total duration of all the successive contracts do not exceed three years.

France
The maximum term is twenty four months and may be extended once only.

Germany
Fixed-term contracts may not be extended more than three times with a maximum total period of two years.

Luxembourg
In Luxembourg, the standard maximum length of a contrat de travail à durée déterminée (CDD) is twenty-four months, with up to two renewals allowed. Researchers and students can employed for a maximum of sixty months on a CDD, with no restriction as to the number of renewals allowed. A waiting period of a minimum of one-third of the length of the contract is required for a CDD to be considered a new contract (and not a renewal) and to restart the maximum allowed duration of employment.

India 
India allows fixed term employment since 2015. Fixed-term employees are entitled to wage and benefits on par with permanent employees.

United Kingdom
Any employee on fixed-term contracts for four or more years will automatically become a permanent employee, unless the employer can show there is a good business reason not to do so.

The Fixed-term Employees (Prevention of Less Favourable Treatment) Regulations 2002 (SI 2002/2034), made on 30 July 2002 and brought into effect on 1 October 2002, implemented the EU's Fixed-term Work Directive (Directive 99/70/EC). The Fixed-term Employees (Prevention of Less Favourable Treatment) (Amendment) Regulations 2008 (SI 2008/2776) amended the 2002 regulations to exclude fixed term agency workers from coverage.

See also
Permanent employment
Part-time
Temporary work

References

Labour law
Employment in the United Kingdom
United Kingdom labour law